The following is a list of Australian radio station callsigns beginning with the number 6, indicating radio stations in the state of Western Australia.

Defunct callsigns

Defunct Short Wave callsigns

Notes

 
Radio station callsigns, Western Australia
Radio
Lists of radio stations in Australia